The Donetsk People's Republic (DPR) and the Luhansk People's Republic (LPR) are two Russian civilian-military administrative regimes in the Donbas region of Ukraine. Russia claims to have annexed them, although it only occupies part of their claimed territories , and treats them as its federal subjects. Before October 2022, they claimed independence from Ukraine, although the international community continues to consider them part of Ukraine's sovereign territory.

The DPR and LPR were proclaimed by Russian-supported separatists in 2014 during the War in Donbas. The militants running the republics held secession referendums, on 11 May 2014. The results of the referendums were not officially accepted by any government except Russia. The Ukrainian government regarded the pro-Russian separatists as terrorists.

The DPR and the LPR attempted to enter into a union in 2014, namely "Novorossiya", although the project was abandoned by 2015. In 2014, South Ossetia—itself a breakaway entity in Georgia—recognized the independence of both entities.

They were recognized as sovereign states by Russia on 21 February 2022, followed by Abkhazia—another breakaway entity in Georgia—four days later. The DPR and LPR were later recognized by two other member states of the United Nations: Syria on 29 June 2022, and North Korea on 13 July 2022.

The DPR and LPR were officially annexed by Russia on 30 September 2022.

History and current state

In November 2014, representatives of Novorossiya sent a request of diplomatic recognition to several Latin American states, including Cuba, Nicaragua, and Venezuela. None of the states answered the request.

In May 2015, the confederation of Novorossiya was shut down due to its "incompatibility with the Normandy Format plan of peace settlement", promoting for DPR and LPR becoming autonomous regions within the Ukrainian borders.

On 15 February 2022, the Russian State Duma voted to ask President Vladimir Putin to recognize the self-declared Donetsk and Luhansk People's Republics in Ukraine as independent states. The bill was proposed by the Communist Party.

On 21 February 2022, the State Duma of Russia passed a bill to officially recognize the self-proclaimed Donetsk People's Republic and Luhansk People's Republic in Eastern Ukraine as independent states. The bill was approved by President Vladimir Putin. On the same day, Putin signed decrees recognizing the Donetsk People's Republic and Luhansk People's Republic, and also signed agreements on friendship, cooperation, and assistance with the republics.

On 24 February 2022, Russia invaded Ukraine, part of which including troops in the two territories. While, this recognition just fully followed by Abkhazia on 25 February 2022, with President Decree that signed by Aslan Bzhania to support Russia stance in recognize Donetsk and Luhansk People's Republic.

A February poll released by the independent Levada Center found that 45% of Russians backed Russia's recognition of the separatist-controlled Donetsk and Luhansk People's Republics.

State Duma deputy Mikhail Matveev voted in favor of the recognition of the self-proclaimed republics of Donetsk and Luhansk but later denounced the 2022 Russian invasion of Ukraine, stating After limited success during a seven-month military campaign, Vladimir Putin recognized the military occupations of parts of Kherson and Zaporizhzhia oblasts as independent states, and signed treaties of accession to the Russian Federation with the Russian-appointed heads of all four partially occupied regions of Ukraine, despite not having full control of their territories.

Positions taken by states and organizations on independence

Countries and entities that recognized the DPR and LPR as independent states

UN member states

Non-UN states

Countries and entities that supported recognizing the DPR and LPR as independent states

UN member states

Non-UN states

Countries and entities that did not recognize the DPR and LPR as independent states

UN member states

Non-UN states

International and regional organizations

Positions taken on annexation 

Two UN member states has recognized the Russian annexation of four partially occupied regions of Ukraine:

See also
 2014 Donbas status referendums
 2022 Russian invasion of Ukraine
 Annexation of Crimea by the Russian Federation
 International recognition of Abkhazia and South Ossetia
 List of states with limited recognition

References

Foreign relations of the Donetsk People's Republic
Foreign relations of the Luhansk People's Republic
Diplomatic recognition
Politics of Ukraine
Russo-Ukrainian War
Events affected by the 2022 Russian invasion of Ukraine